Viktor Yegorovich Zubarev (10 April 1973 – 18 October 2004) was a football forward from Kazakhstan. He was nicknamed Uncle Stepan (дядя Стёпа).

Career
He played for Batyr, Irtysh and Esil Bogatyr in his native country, for Arsenal Tula and Lokomotiv Nizhny Novgorod in Russia, and for Apollon Limassol in Cyprus.

International team
Zubarev was called up by coach Serik Berdalin to represent the national team in a match against Pakistan for the 1998 FIFA World Cup qualifiers. He scored his first hat-trick in this match, which Kazakhstan won 7–0. He would go on to score 12 goals in 18 caps, being the second top scorer of the national team, only surpassed by Ruslan Baltiev.

International goals
All his scored goals are shown in the box below, with the Score and Result column listing Kazakhstan's goal tally first.

Death
Zubarev died in his apartment in Omsk.

Career statistics

International

Honours

Club
Irtysh Pavlodar
 Top Division/Super League (4): 1997, 1999, 2002, 2003
 Kazakhstan Cup (1): 1997-98
Apollon Limassol
 Cypriot Cup (1): 2000–01

Personal
 GOAL Journal "Best Player of the year": 1999
 Cypriot Cup Winner: 2001

References

External links
Memorial article 

1973 births
2004 deaths
Apollon Limassol FC players
Association football forwards
Kazakhstani footballers
Kazakhstan international footballers
Kazakhstani expatriate footballers
Kazakhstani people of Russian descent
Expatriate footballers in Cyprus
Cypriot First Division players
Kazakhstan Premier League players
FC Lokomotiv Nizhny Novgorod players
FC Irtysh Pavlodar players
FC Kyzylzhar players
Drug-related deaths in Russia
Footballers at the 1998 Asian Games
FC Arsenal Tula players
Asian Games competitors for Kazakhstan